This page lists the winners and nominees for the Billboard Music Award for Top R&B Song. This award was first given in 1992 and since its conception, Pharrell Williams and The Weeknd are the only artists to win the award twice.

Winners and nominees
Winners are listed first and highlighted in bold.

1990s

2000s

2010s

2020s

Multiple wins and nominations

Wins
2 wins
 Pharrell Williams
 The Weeknd

Nominations

6 nominations
 Chris Brown

5 nominations
 Drake
 Usher
 The Weeknd

4 nominations
 Justin Bieber
 Alicia Keys
 Rihanna

3 nominations
 Bruno Mars
 Doja Cat
 Jay Z
 Khalid
 Ludacris
 Pharrell Williams

2 nominations
 Jhené Aiko
 Ella Mai
 Faith Evans
 Giveon
 Whitney Houston
 Jeremih
 DJ Khaled
 R. Kelly
 Lil Jon
 Lil Wayne
 Miguel
 Musiq
 Nicki Minaj
 Nelly
 Quavo
 Puff Daddy
 Trey Songz
 TLC
 Tyga

References

Billboard awards